Mumtaz Hussain is a Pakistani-American artist, filmmaker, graphic designer who was born in Jhang, Pakistan.

History and education
Upon graduation, he was commissioned to construct a seventy-foot mural in Lahore's town center; he was also commissioned to decorate the Sheikh Zaid bin Sultan Palace, an architectural landmark in Karachi, under his instructors' supervision.

Film
Hussain has participated in a number of films as director, writer, producer of both animations and short films. Titles to date include the feature length Art=(Love)2, for which he also produced the paintings used as a key narrative device in the film (2011), and shorts Butterfly Screams (2007), Push Button For (2006), Yeh Mera Pakistan Hai (This is My Pakistan) for Pakistani TV Channel GEO (2005), Inside You (2004).

His film Soul of Civilization has been shown at the Metropolitan Museum of Art in New York City as part of its 2003 exhibit The Art of the First Cities.

His art and films have been shown at numerous museums, universities, art galleries, and many international film Festivals, including the 6th Karachi International Film Festival (KaraFilm).

Filmography

Director
2012: Art=(Love)² 
2007: Butterfly Screams 
2006: Push Button For 
2005: Yeh Mera Pakistan Hai (This Is My Pakistan) 
2004: Inside You 
2003: Soul of Civilization

Plays
2015: Legal Alien 
2022: Virus Bomb'https://www.app.com.pk/global/a-pakistani-artists-play-depicting-covid-victims-suffering-staged-in-new-york/https://virusbomb.org

Awards and honors

2012 Gold Winner - Prestige Award (Art=(Love)²)
2012 Official Selection - Vegas Cine Fest (Art=(Love)²)
2012 Platinum Reel Award - Nevada Film Festival (Art=(Love)²)
2013 The Kind Executioner was selected for the Final List in the Hollywood Screenplay Contest 2013
2014 Official selection of "Art=(Love)2" in Indian Film Festival in New York 2014 

References

External links
 
 Indo-American Arts Council Web site
 
 
 Did you know?: Film-maker Mumtaz Hussain awarded for 'The Kind Executioner'
 Voice of America (Urdu) interview on film The Kind Executioner (نامور مصنف، تخلیق کار و فلم ساز، ممتاز حسین ) 
 BBC Urdu on Hussain's film Butterfly Screams
 BBC Urdu on Hussain's book Behind the Round Glasses
 Prestige Award for Film "Latest Gold Winners"
 Vegas CineFest International Film Festival – "FRIDAY SCREENINGS"
 2012 Platinum Reel - "Award Winners"
 The News International: No killing weapon found in Indus Valley civilisation
 Screening of Art=(Love)²
 Profile of Mumtaz Hussain
 Art=(Love)²: A Whirlwind Story of Love, Death and Closure
 Art=(Love)²'': A Film on Love, Life and Loss
 Art=(Love)² Movie Review
 Art=(Love)² Movie Review
 http://nation.com.pk/entertainment/13-Nov-2015/vigorous-play-about-capitalism-played-by-pakistani-artist-in-ny
http://www.dawn.com/news/1137305/review-lafzon-main-tasweerain-by-mumtaz-hussain
 https://www.dawn.com/news/1540210
http://www.dawn.com/news/1252607/the-artist-who-believes-local-art-can-counter-violence
http://www.express.com.pk/epaper/index.aspx?Issue=NP_LHE&Page=Magazine_Page015&Date=20160426&Pageno=17&View=1
http://www.express.com.pk/epaper/index.aspx?Issue=NP_KHI&Page=Magazine_Page016&Date=20160526&Pageno=16&View=1

http://www.queensmuseum.org/events/raza-rumi-book-launch-screening-of-they-are-killing-the-horse

1954 births
Living people
American people of Pakistani descent
Pakistani contemporary artists
National College of Arts alumni
Pakistani filmmakers
Pakistani art directors
Pakistani graphic designers
People from Jhang District
American film directors